Van Looy is a Dutch toponymic surname. Notable people with the surname include:

Bent Van Looy (born 1976), Belgian pop singer and songwriter
Erik Van Looy (born 1962), Belgian film director
Frans Van Looy (born 1950), Belgian cyclist
Jacobus van Looy (1855–1930), Dutch painter and writer
Lucas Van Looy (born 1941), Belgian Catholic bishop
Rik Van Looy (born 1933), Belgian cyclist
Sander van Looy (born 1997), Dutch football defender

References

See also
Van Loo, Dutch surname with a similar origin

Dutch-language surnames
Toponymic surnames